Angola competed at the 2019 World Athletics Championships in Doha, Qatar, from 27 September–6 October 2019. Angola had entered 1 athlete.

Result

Men
Track and road events

References

External links
Doha｜WCH 19｜World Athletics

Angola
World Athletics Championships
2019